Blyxa is a genus of an aquatic plant of the family Hydrocharitaceae described as a genus in 1806.

It is native to tropical and subtropical regions of Africa, Asia, Madagascar, and Australia.

Species
 Blyxa aubertii A. Rich. - China, Japan, Korea, Indian Subcontinent, SE Asia, New Guinea, N Australia, Caroline Islands, Madagascar, Tanzania, Mozambique
 Blyxa echinosperma (C.B.Clarke) Hook.f. - China, Japan, Korea, Indian Subcontinent, SE Asia, New Guinea, N Australia
 Blyxa hexandra C.D.K.Cook & Luond - central Africa
 Blyxa japonica (Miq.) Maxim. ex Asch. & Gürke - China, Japan, Korea, Indian Subcontinent, SE Asia, New Guinea
 Blyxa javanica Hassk. - Java
 Blyxa leiosperma Koidz. - Japan, Anhui, Fujian, Guangdong, Hainan, Jiangxi, Zhejiang 
 Blyxa novoguineensis Hartog - Papua New Guinea 
 Blyxa octandra (Roxb.) Planch. ex Thwaites - China, Indian Subcontinent, Myanmar, Thailand, New Guinea
 Blyxa quadricostata Hartog - Myanmar, Thailand
 Blyxa radicans Ridl. - central Africa
 Blyxa senegalensis Dandy - West Africa
 Blyxa vietii C.D.K.Cook & Luond - Vietnam

References

Hydrocharitaceae
Hydrocharitaceae genera
Aquatic plants